Mario Moretti (30 December 1906 – 13 September 1977) was an Italian rower. He competed at the 1932 Summer Olympics in Los Angeles with the men's double sculls where they came fourth.

References

1906 births
1977 deaths
Italian male rowers
Olympic rowers of Italy
Rowers at the 1932 Summer Olympics
Rowers from Milan
European Rowing Championships medalists